Camillo Daddeo or Camillo Doddeo (1534–1600) was a Roman Catholic prelate who served as Bishop of Fossano (1592–1600)
and Bishop of Brugnato (1584–1592).

Biography
Camillo Daddeo was born in Mondovì, Italy in 1534.
On 13 August 1584, he was appointed during the papacy of Pope Gregory XIII as Bishop of Brugnato.
On 15 April 1592, he was appointed during the papacy of Pope Clement VIII as Bishop of Fossano.
He served as Bishop of Fossano until his death on 24 September 1600.

References

External links and additional sources
 (for Chronology of Bishops) 
 (for Chronology of Bishops) 
 (for Chronology of Bishops) 
 (for Chronology of Bishops) 

16th-century Italian Roman Catholic bishops
17th-century Italian Roman Catholic bishops
Bishops appointed by Pope Gregory XIII
Bishops appointed by Pope Clement VIII
1534 births
1600 deaths